is a 2002 novel by Japanese author Haruki Murakami. Its 2005 English translation was among "The 10 Best Books of 2005" from The New York Times and received the World Fantasy Award for 2006. The book tells the stories of the young Kafka Tamura, a bookish 15-year-old boy who runs away from his Oedipal curse, and Satoru Nakata, an old, disabled man with the uncanny ability to talk to cats. The book incorporates themes of music as a communicative conduit, metaphysics, dreams, fate, the subconscious.

After the release of the book, Murakami allowed for questions about the novel to be sent in, and responded to many of them. The novel was generally well-received, with positive reviews from John Updike and the New York Times.

Title
The title of the book, according to Alan Cheuse of NPR, is suggestive and mysterious to Japanese readers - Franz Kafka is categorized as a Western writer who is well-known by Americans but is not so in Japan. He compares it to titles such as Genji on the Hudson. Psychoanalyst Hayao Kawai saw special meaning in the name "Kafka", as its Japanese version, Kafuka, could be a combination of 可 (ka, meaning possible or good) and 不可 (fuka, meaning the opposite), thus giving the book liminality.

Plot summary
Comprising two distinct but interrelated plots, the narrative runs back and forth between both plots, taking up each plotline in alternating chapters.

The odd-numbered chapters tell the 15-year-old Kafka's story as he runs away from his father's house to escape an Oedipal curse and to embark upon a quest to find his mother and sister. On the bus to Takamatsu, he meets a girl named Sakura, with whom he feels attraction to but refuses to act on due to him not knowing if she might be his sister. After a series of adventures, he finds shelter in a quiet, private library in Takamatsu, run by the distant and aloof Miss Saeki and the intelligent and more welcoming Oshima. There he spends his days reading the unabridged Richard Francis Burton translation of One Thousand and One Nights and the collected works of Natsume Sōseki until the police begin inquiring after him in connection with the murder of his father that he does not know he has committed. Oshima brings him to the forests of Kōchi Prefecture, where Kafka is ultimately healed.

The even-numbered chapters tell Nakata's story. They start with military reports of a strange incident in Yamanashi Prefecture where multiple children, including Nakata, collapse in the woods - Nakata, after the incident, is the only one of the children who came out of the incident without any memory and unable to read and write. The incident is initially blamed on poisonous gas, but it is later revealed that it was the result of a lustful teacher beating Nakata. Later on in the book, it is shown that due to his uncanny abilities, Nakata has found part-time work in his old age as a finder of lost cats (Murakami's earlier work The Wind-Up Bird Chronicle also involves searching for a lost cat). Having finally located and returned one particular cat to its owners, Nakata finds that the circumstances of the case have put him on a path which, unfolding one step at a time before him, takes the illiterate man far away from his familiar and comforting home territory. Nakata kills a man named Johnnie Walker, a cat murderer. He takes a gigantic leap of faith in going on the road for the first time in his life, unable even to read a map and without knowing where he will eventually end up. He befriends a truck driver named Hoshino, who takes him on as a passenger in his truck and soon becomes very attached to the old man. He heads for Takamatsu, an unknown force driving him there.

Major themes
The power and beauty of music as a communicative medium is one of the central ideas of the novel—the very title comes from a song Kafka is given on a record in the library. The music of Beethoven, specifically the Archduke Trio, is also used as a redemptive metaphor. Metaphysics is also a central concept of the novel as many of the character's dialogues and soliloquy are motivated by their inquiry about the nature of the world around them and their relation to it. Among other prominent ideas are: the virtues of self-sufficiency, the relation of dreams and reality, the threat of fate, the uncertain grip of prophecy, and the influence of the subconscious.

Style
Kafka on the Shore demonstrates Murakami's typical blend of popular culture, mundane detail, magical realism, suspense, humor, an involved plot, and potent sexuality. It also features an increased emphasis on Japanese religious traditions, particularly Shinto. The main characters are significant departures from the typical protagonist of a Murakami novel, such as Toru Watanabe of Norwegian Wood and Toru Okada of The Wind-Up Bird Chronicle, who are typically in their 20s or 30s and have rather humdrum personalities. However, many of the same concepts that were first developed in these and other previous novels re-occur in Kafka on the Shore.

G. W. F. Hegel has an influence on the book and is referenced directly at one point.

Characters

Humans
 Kafka Tamura

The character's true given name is never revealed to the reader.  After having run away from home, he chooses the new name "Kafka", in honor of writer Franz Kafka. Kafka is described as being muscular for his age and a  "cool, tall, fifteen-year-old boy lugging a backpack and a bunch of obsessions". He's also the son of the famous sculptor Koichi Tamura. His mother and sister left the family when he was four years old and he can't remember their faces. He occasionally interacts with his metaphysical alter ego "The boy named Crow" ("Kafka" sounds like "kavka", which means "jackdaw", a crow-like bird, in Czech). Crow tells Kafka throughout the novel that he must be "the toughest fifteen-year-old in the world" and thus motivates him to pursue the journey of running away from home. It is heavily suggested throughout the novel that he, Miss Saeki, and Nakata are somehow connected by an 'alternate reality' on which metaphysical objects from people's subconsciousness take form leading them to find an 'essence' to their lives in exchange for taking away a 'part' of their soul.

 Satoru Nakata

Nakata lost many of his mental faculties when he was a child; as one of sixteen schoolchildren on a mushroom-gathering field-trip toward the end of World War II, they were rendered unconscious following a mysterious flash of light in the sky (although it is later revealed that the light wasn't the main cause). This event is referred to in the novel as the "Rice Bowl Hill incident". Unlike the other children, who recovered shortly after, Nakata remained unconscious for many weeks and, upon finally awakening, found that his memory and ability to read had disappeared, as well as his higher intellectual functions (i.e. abstract thinking), essentially making him a "blank slate". In their place, Nakata found he was able to communicate with cats, and from then on, he always referred to himself in the third person. It is hinted that Nakata and Miss Saeki have been through the 'alternate reality' before and it's where they left a 'part' of their 'soul', leading to their shadows being irregular compared to normal people's.
 
 Oshima  A 21-year-old, intellectual, haemophiliac, and gay transgender man. He is a librarian and an owner of a cabin in the mountains near Komura Memorial Library who becomes close to Kafka throughout the course of the novel. He becomes the mentor of Kafka as he guides him to the answers that he's seeking on his journey.
 Hoshino  A truck driver in his mid-twenties. He befriends Nakata, due to his resemblance to his own grandfather, and transports and assists him towards his uncertain goal.
 Miss Saeki  The manager of a private library, where Oshima works and where Kafka lives through much of the novel. She was previously a singer, and performed the song "Kafka on the Shore", which unites many of the novel's themes. Although her outward appearance makes her look normal, she suffers from an existential crisis after the death of her boyfriend. She journeyed to the 'alternate reality' when she was 15 years old due to her strong desire to keep her happiness forever, eventually discovering the 'essence' used to compose "Kafka on the Shore". However it led to that version of herself 'separating' from her.
 Sakura  A young woman whom Kafka meets on the bus by chance. She assists him later in his journey. She is later raped by Kafka in a dream.
 Johnnie Walker  A cat killer who plans to make a flute out of cats' souls. His name is taken from Johnnie Walker, a brand of Scotch whisky, and he dresses to appear like the man featured in the brand's logo.
 Colonel Sanders  An 'abstract concept' who takes the form of a pimp or hustler. He is named after, and takes the appearance of, Harland Sanders, the founder and face of Kentucky Fried Chicken. He helps Hoshino to find the 'entrance stone' to the 'alternate reality.'

Cats

 Goma A lost cat owned by Mrs. Koizumi.
 Otsuka An elderly black cat with whom Nakata easily communicates. 
 Kawamura A brown cat who was addled after being hit by a bicycle.  Though they can communicate, Nakata is unable to understand Kawamura's repetitive and strange sentences.
 Mimi An intelligent Siamese cat. Her name comes from "My name is Mimi" in Puccini's opera "La Boheme".
 Okawa A tabby cat.
 Toro A black cat that temporarily became an 'abstract concept'.

Analysis
Scholar Michael Seats compared the liminality of the novel to Jacques Derrida's exegesis of the concept of pharmakon. According to Seats, the novel's interpretations can be contradictory, and many can be correct.

Through the lens of psychoanalytic theory, Kafka is a schizoid character suffering from a deep Oedipal curse. Kafka's heart is Kafka, his self-constructed personality, while his unconscious, the one who fulfilled the Oedipal prophecy of father-killing when he turned 15, is Crow. The character Sakura is interpreted as the embodiment of the "healed" personality, who is able to connect to the real world well. Kafka, stuck in the mirror stage, cannot cope with her care, as she has power over the symbolic order. The character Oshima represents the mind-body-spirit split within Kafka. The character Johnny Walker is a symbol of Julia Kristeva's concept of the partially constituted subject.

Understanding the novel
After the story's release, Murakami's  Japanese publisher invited readers to submit questions to its website on the meaning of the book.  Murakami responded personally to around 1,200 of the 8,000 questions received.

In an interview posted on his English-language website, Murakami says that the secret to understanding the novel lies in reading it several times: "Kafka on the Shore contains several riddles, but there aren't any solutions provided.  Instead, several of these riddles combine, and through their interaction the possibility of a solution takes shape.  And the form this solution takes will be different for each reader.  To put it another way, the riddles function as part of the solution.  It's hard to explain, but that's the kind of novel I set out to write".

Reception

John Updike described it as a "real page-turner, as well as an insistently metaphysical mind-bender". Since its 2005 English-language release (2006 PEN/Book-of-the-Month Club Translation Prize-winning translation by Philip Gabriel), the novel has received mostly positive reviews and critical acclaim, including a spot on The New York Times 10 Best Books of 2005 and the World Fantasy Award.

References

External links

Reviews
 Kafka on the Shore reviews at Exorcising Ghosts
 Kafka on the Shore review by John Updike at The New Yorker
 Kafka on the Shore reviews at Metacritic
 Kafka on the Shore review in the Oxonian Review
 Kafka on the Shore review at Shogokawada
 Kafka on the Shore review at ARC Review
 Kafka on the Shore reviews at Complete Review
 Kafka on the Shore review by Ted Gioia at The New Canon

Interviews
  Interview with Murakami on Kafka on the Shore at Book Browse

2002 Japanese novels
Novels by Haruki Murakami
Metafictional novels
Japanese magic realism novels
Japanese fantasy novels
Japanese LGBT novels
Novels about cats
Novels about rape
Patricide in fiction
Incest in fiction
Works about Franz Kafka
Novels about music
World Fantasy Award for Best Novel-winning works
Novels with transgender themes
2000s LGBT novels
Postmodern novels
Novels set in Tokyo
Novels set in Kagawa Prefecture
2002 LGBT-related literary works